Limnonectes namiyei is a species of frog in the family Dicroglossidae. It is endemic to Okinawa Island, Japan. It is named after Motoyoshi Namiye, a Japanese naturalist and herpetologist. Its common name is Okinawa wart frog or Namiye's frog; the latter name is also spelled Namie's frog.

Its natural habitats are upstream regions in primary broad-leaved evergreen forest. It used to be a common frog but has greatly declined because of habitat loss (deforestation, road and dam construction) and predation by invasive mongooses.

References

namiyei
Amphibians of Japan
Endemic fauna of the Ryukyu Islands
Taxa named by Leonhard Stejneger
Amphibians described in 1901
Taxonomy articles created by Polbot